Tembusu Partners is a boutique Singapore-based private equity firm which invests in venture to growth stage companies in technology, education and healthcare sectors. The firm also previously facilitated the Singapore Valley Awards - an entrepreneurship initiative to award local university students with internships at leading innovation companies in China.

Overview
The private equity firm has invested in growth companies in industries including energy, education, healthcare, software and technology. The firm was founded in 2006 by four Singapore-based business families - Andy Lim, Tan Kim Seng, Tan Boy Tee and Chew Hua Seng. Tembusu is headquartered in Singapore. Tembusu China has established overseas offices in Shanghai and Guiyang, and is the first and only recipient of the Qualified Foreign Limited Partner (“QFLP”) status from the Guizhou government.

Tembusu is a Monetary Authority of Singapore (MAS) CMS-licensed fund manager since 2013, and registered private equity fund manager with the Asset Management Association of China (AMAC) since 2018.  

The company has invested in deep technology start-ups such as cloud-based enterprise software provider Deskera, Vi Dimensions, cybersecurity firm Sixscape Communications, as well as in coal assets and education.

Investment Funds

Tembusu Growth Fund, Tembusu Growth Fund II, Tembusu Growth GIP Fund and Tembusu Growth Fund III have been awarded Pioneer Status with zero-rated tax incentive for both the fund and the fund management company by Singapore's Inland Revenue Department (IRAS) under section S13H of the Singapore Income Tax Act.

Tembusu Growth Growth Fund, Tembusu GIP Fund and Tembusu Growth Fund III both qualified under the Global Investor Programme for permanent residency status by the Singapore Economic Development Board.

Tembusu Growth GIP Fund was awarded a “Preferred Provider” rating by independent fund rating agency Mercer (Singapore) and Contact Singapore. 

ICT Fund I is one of only six funds selected by National Research Foundation (NRF) as part of the Early Stage Venture Fund (ESVF) II Scheme. It is the only venture capital fund in Singapore investing solely in deep-tech software startups. 

Tembusu Blockchain Fund is a VC fund headquartered in Singapore focusing exclusively on blockchain-related investments. Broad of areas include blockchain infrastructure and applications in Telecoms, Media and Technology ("TMT"), Digital Payment, Media technologies and Data analytics.

Tembusu Guizhou Baijiu Fund is a China QFLP fund which focuses in investing in Guizhou moutai-flavoured baijiu spirits, in strategic partnership with the Renhuai City investment authority.

Team

Founders
Andy Lim is the Founder and Chairman of private equity firm Tembusu Partners and the Chairman and controlling shareholder of a publicly listed company Viking Offshore & Marine Limited. He is also the Executive Director of Associated Leisure International, a family holding company and Chairman of MoneyWorld Group of Companies. In September 2004, Lim was appointed Honorary Consul to the Republic of Lithuania.

Tan Kim Seng is the founder and former Executive Chairman of KS Energy Services. He started the company as an industrial hardware business in 1974, and subsequently expanded its range of business to rig refurbishment, oil and gas equipment, hydraulic equipment, spares and parts and instrumentation.

Tan Boy Tee is one of the four founders of Tembusu Partners. His investments include Ezion Holdings and Viking Offshore & Marine. Through privately-held holding company Bestford Capital, he also has investments in the oil and gas and hospitality sectors, including a majority stake in US hotel chain Red Roof Inn. Tan is represented by his son Thomas Tan in Tembusu Partners.

Chew Hua Seng is the founding chairman and CEO of private education provider Raffles Education Corporation, which has 30 colleges and universities in 13 countries. He has since sold his stakes in Tembusu Partners to Thomas Tan, son of Tan Boy Tee.

Directors
Lim Hwee Hua is Co-Chairman of Tembusu and wife of founder Andy Lim. She was in politics for 15 years and a Cabinet minister of Singapore from 2009 to 2011. She joined Tembusu after quitting politics in 2011. Lim has also served as the Managing Director at Temasek Holdings (2000-2004).

Professor Hum Sin Hoon is independent director of Tembusu Partners, and currently serves as Deputy Dean of the NUS Business School.

Managing Partners 
Brijesh Pande is the Founder and Managing Partner of Tembusu ICT Fund I. He has more than 20 years of experience in private equity and investment banking across Asia, Europe and the Americas with Citigroup, ANZ and SBI. Mr Pande previously was Managing Director and Head of Private Equity at SBI Ven Capital Pte Ltd, the overseas investment subsidiary of SBI Holdings, Japan (formerly Softbank Investments), with an AUM in excess of USD 300 Million. 

Mock Pak Lum was the Chief Technology Officer of StarHub before moving on to be the Chief Business Development Officer. He retired from Starhub in 2017 and is now Managing Partner of Tembusu Blockchain Fund I.

Awards and Track Record
Tembusu Partners won the award for “Best PE-Backed Exit” at the 2011 SVCA Gala Dinner and Awards Ceremony held on 29 September 2011 was won by the Company for its exit of its investment in Artivision Technologies Ltd in June 2011. Another of Tembusu’s portfolio companies, Zeco Systems Pte Ltd (also known as Greenlots), was nominated as a finalist for “Most Innovative Cleantech Company” at the Awards.

References

External links
 The company's website

Private equity firms
Alternative investment management companies